Operation Yiftach (Mivtza Yiftah) was a Palmach offensive carried out between 28 April and 23 May 1948. The objectives were to capture Safed and to secure the eastern Galilee before the British Mandate ended on 14 May 1948. It was carried out by two Palmach battalions commanded by Yigal Allon.

Background
Operation Yiftach was part of Plan Dalet which aimed at securing the areas allocated to the Jewish state in the UN partition plan before the end of the British Mandate in Palestine. With the ending of the Mandate in sight, British forces had begun to withdraw from less strategic areas such as north-eastern Galilee. In these areas there was a scramble by both sides to occupy abandoned police and military facilities. Local militias and Arab volunteers had taken over the Palestine Police forts in Safed and at Nebi Yusha. On 17 April the Haganah launched an attack on the fort at Nebi Yusha, which failed. A second attack on 20 April resulted in the deaths of twenty two of the attackers. As a result of this defeat Yigal Allon, the Palmach C.O. was given command of the operation. Nebi Yusha was finally taken on 20 April in an attack in which planes dropped incendiary bombs on the fort. The army camp at Rosh Pinna was handed over to the Haganah/Palmach by its British commander on 28 April. Allon approached the campaign believing that the best way of securing the frontiers was to clear the area completely of all Arab forces and inhabitants. This operation was to be the foundation of his reputation that 'he left no Arab civilian communities in his wake.'

Safed had a pre-war population of 10,000–12,000 Arabs and 1,500 Jews, and was the base for 700-800 local and foreign irregulars. The attack on Safed was similar to the attack on Arab Tiberias on 16–17 April, in that it began with a particularly destructive attack on a neighbouring village resulting in loss of morale in the town.

Operation
On 1 May 1948, the Palmach's 3rd Battalion attacked the village of Ein al-Zeitun 1 km North of Safed. It began shelling the village at 03:00 in the morning, using one of the first Davidka mortars as well as two 3-inch and eight 2-inch conventional mortars. The Davidka was a homemade mortar that fired an oversized shell and was nearly useless due to its inaccuracy, but was useful because of the loud noise of the projectile when it flew and detonated. Although hardly capable of causing casualties, the weapon actually was quite effective in demoralizing defending Arabs, some of whom reportedly even thought the explosions were "atomic bombs", which they knew Jews had helped to develop.

Once they entered the village most of the 'young adult males' fled but 37 were taken prisoner and were probably amongst the 70 men executed in a valley between the village and Safed two days later. Those who remained in the village were rounded up and expelled. Over the next two days Palmach sappers blew up and burnt houses in the village. There followed a sub-operation, Operation Matateh, starting on 4 May, which cleared five Bedouin tribes from the Jordan Valley south of Rosh Pinna."

On 6 May the Palmach launched a ground attack on Safed, but failed to take the citadel. The failure was blamed on insufficient bombardment. Despite Arab attempts to negotiate a truce and the British Army being authorised to intervene, a second attack was launched on night of 9–10 May. It was preceded by a 'massive, concentrated' mortar bombardment in which the Davidka was used again. An Israeli account describes the final assault as occurring in heavy rainfall, with Palmach forces fighting "all night, attacking in waves up the hilly streets of the town, fighting from house to house and from room to room."

Following the capture of Safed, Palmach units moved north to secure the borders with Lebanon and Syria. On 14–15 May the Palmach's 1st Battalion was involved in a clash with Lebanese units at Qabas. In his later writing Allon claimed that a 'whispering' campaign he launched was of great importance. This involved local Jewish mukhtars who had contacts in local Arab communities being told "to whisper in the ears of several Arabs that giant Jewish reinforcements had reached Galilee and were about to clean out the villages of the Hula". An IDF intelligence report attributed success to this tactic in the case of ten villages, though it suggest that some may also have been bombarded. There is some evidence that 'Syrian officers or Arab irregular commanders' ordered women and children be evacuated from villages north-east of Rosh Pinna.

Aftermath
In the words of Chaim Herzog, on the morning of 11 May "the by-now-familiar mass Arab evacuation from the town began." The only civilians who remained in Safed were "about" 100 Muslims, "average age 80" and "34-36 elderly Christian Arabs". In late May or early June the Muslims were "expelled" to Lebanon and on 13 June the Christians were removed by lorry to Haifa. 4–5,000 Bedouin and villagers who remained in the Hula area after the creation of the state of Israel were trucked across the Syrian border during the 1956 Suez War.

Arab communities captured during Operation Yiftach

See also
Depopulated Palestinian locations in Israel

References

Bibliography
Walid Khalidi, All That Remains, . Uses 1945 census for population figures.
Benny Morris, The Birth of the Palestinian refugee problem, 1947–1949,.

Yiftach
History of Safed
April 1948 events in Asia
May 1948 events in Asia